Education in Indonesia falls under the responsibility of the Ministry of Education, Culture, Research, and Technology (Kementerian Pendidikan, Kebudayaan, Riset, dan Teknologi or Kemdikbudristek) and the Ministry of Religious Affairs (Kementerian Agama or Kemenag). In Indonesia, all citizens must undertake twelve years of compulsory education which consists of six years at elementary level and three each at middle and high school levels. Islamic, Christian, Catholic, and Buddhist Schools are under the responsibility of the Ministry of Religious Affairs.

Education is defined as a planned effort to establish a study environment and educational process so that the student may actively develop their own potential in religious and spiritual level, consciousness, personality, intelligence, behaviour and creativity to themselves, other citizens and the nation. The Constitution also notes that there are two types of education in Indonesia: formal and non-formal. Formal education is further divided into three levels: primary, secondary and tertiary education.

Schools in Indonesia are run either by the government (negeri) or private sectors (swasta). Some private schools refer to themselves as "national plus schools" which means that their curriculum exceeds requirements set by the Ministry of Education, especially with the use of English as medium of instruction or having an international-based curriculum instead of the national one. In Indonesia there are approximately 170,000 primary schools, 40,000 junior-secondary schools and 26,000 high schools. 84 percent of these schools are under the Ministry of Education and Culture and the remaining 16 percent under the Ministry of Religious Affairs.

History

Islamic kingdoms period
The emergence of Islamic state in Indonesia is noted by the acculturation of Islamic and Hindu-Buddhist traditions. At this time, pondok pesantren, a type of Islamic boarding school was introduced and several of them were established. The location of pesantren is mostly faraway from the hustling crowd of the city, resembling the location of Karsyan.

Dutch colonial period
Elementary education was introduced by the Dutch in Indonesia during the colonial era. The Dutch education system are query strings of educational branches that were based on social status of the colony's population, with the best available institution reserved for the European population.

In 1870, with the growth of Dutch Ethical Policy formulated by Conrad Theodor van Deventer, some of these Dutch-founded schools opened the doors for pribumi (lit. native Indonesians). They were called Sekolah Rakjat (lit. folk school), the embryo of what is called Sekolah Dasar (lit. elementary school) today. In 1871 the Dutch parliament adopted a new education law that sought to uniform the highly scattered and diversified indigenous education systems across the archipelago, and expand the number of teacher training schools under the supervision of the colonial administration. The budget for public schooling was raised in steps from ca. 300,000 guilders in 1864 to roughly 3 million guilders by the early 1890s. Most often, however, the education development were starved of funding, because many Dutch politicians feared expanding education would eventually lead to anti-colonial sentiment.  Funding for education only counted for 6% of the total expenditure of the colonial budget in the 1920s. The number of government and private primary schools for natives had increased to 3,108 and the libraries to 3,000 by 1930. However, spending sharply declined after the economic depression in 1930.

The Dutch introduced a system of formal education for the local population of Indonesia, although this was restricted to certain privileged children. The schools for the European were modeled after the education system in Netherlands itself and required proficiency in Dutch. The Dutch language was also needed for higher education enrollment. The elite native/Chinese population who lack Dutch language skills could enroll in either Dutch Native or Chinese schools. The schools were arranged in the following levels:
ELS (Dutch: Europeesche Lagereschool lit. "European Low School") – primary school for Europeans
HSS (Dutch: Hollandsch-Schakelschool lit. "Dutch-Switch School") 
HIS (Dutch: Hollandsch-Inlandscheschool lit. "Dutch-Native School") – primary school for natives
HCS (Dutch: Hollandsch-Chinescheschool lit. "Dutch-Chinese School") - primary school for Chinese
MULO (Dutch: Meer Uitgebreid Lager Onderwijs lit. "More Advanced Low Education") – middle school
AMS (Dutch: Algemene Middelbareschool lit. "General Middle School") – high school or college
HBS (Dutch: Hogere Burgerschool lit. "Higher Citizen School") – pre-university

For the population in rural areas, the Dutch created the Desa Schools or village schools system which aimed to spread literacy among the native population. These schools provide two or three years training of vernacular subjects (reading, writing, ciphering, hygiene, animals and plants, etc.) and served as cheaper alternative schools. These village schools, however, received much less funding than the privileged European schools, thus the quality of education provided is often lacking. Despite its flaws, the number of village schools reached 17,695 by 1930. The rest of the rural education were left to the work of Christian missionary, which are considered more cost-efficient.

The segregation between Dutch and Indonesian in education pushed several Indonesian figures to start educational institutions for local people. Arab Indonesians founded Jamiat Kheir in 1905, Ahmad Dahlan founded Muhammadiyah in November 1912, and Ki Hajar Dewantara founded Taman Siswa in July 1922 to emancipate the native population. Pesantrens (Islamic schools) were also mushrooming rapidly during this period.

During the colonial period there was a large gap between the educated male and female population. In 1920, on the island of Java and Madura out of the 6.5% literate male population, only 0.5% of the female native population are literate. Similar phenomenon can be observed on the 'Foreign Orientals' (Arabs and Chinese), with 26.5% literate male population and only 8.5% literate females out of the total population. In the outer islands beyond Java the difference between literate male and female population are 12% and 3% out of the population respectively. Inspired by a Javanese-born aristocrat Kartini who died young at the age of 25, the Van Deventer family worked to increase female involvement in education and received support from the Dutch government — eventually leading to foundation of Kartini Schools in 1911.

The Dutch colonial government established universities and colleges for native Indonesian on the island of Java. Before founding the Bandung Institute of Technology in 1920, there was no university-level education in the country; students had to go abroad (mainly to Netherlands) to receive it. Most of these universities have become the country's top educational institution as of today. These institutions are as follow:
School tot Opleiding van Inlandsche Artsen or STOVIA, a medical university which later become Geneeskundige Hogeschool in Batavia.
Nederland-Indische Artsen School or NIAS, a medical school in Soerabaja.
Rechts-Hoge-School, a law school in Weltevreden, Batavia.
De Technische Hoge-School, or THS, a technic school in Bandoeng and the first full-fledged university in the country  (opened in 1920).
Middelbare Landbouw-school, an agriculture college which later become Landbouwkundige Faculteit in Buitenzorg
Opleiding-School voor Inlandsche Ambtenaren or OSVIA, colleges for training native civil servants.
Hollandsche-Indische Kweek-school, colleges for training teachers.

By the 1930s, the Dutch had introduced limited formal education to nearly every province of the Dutch East Indies, although by this period only 7.4% of the population were literate in 1931 and 2% were fluent in Dutch. Around the outer islands beyond Java, to meet demand of schooling, the Dutch government relied heavily on missionary schools that mostly provide basic and moral education.

Japanese occupation

During the Japanese occupation in World War II, the operations of the Dutch education system were consolidated into a single operation that parallel the Japanese education system. The Japanese occupation marked the deterioration of education in Indonesia, as schools were organized with the goal of creating Greater East Asia Co-Prosperity Sphere of influence. As a result, schools began training in military and physical drill that were anti-West oriented. It included indoctrination of Japanese culture and history. Students were required to raise the Japanese flag and bow to the Emperor every morning. The Japanese made schools less stratified; despite this, enrollment had shrunk by 30% for primary education and 90% for secondary education by 1945.

Post independence

Under the Japanese and Dutch occupation, most of the educational institutions were created to support the needs of the occupying power. There were very few efforts to promote the intellectual advancement of the indigenous population. After Indonesia declared its independence in 1945, the surviving education system was fragile and unorganized. In addition there was a shortage of teachers, as most of them had been Dutch or Japanese. Very few Indonesians had experience in managing schools.

Eager to address the neglect of focused education on native population, the first government of Indonesia had to create a system from scratch and reject the colonial European system. An Act declared in the 1945 constitution as Chapter 8, article 31, clause 1 that "every citizen has the right for education". The Ministry of Education, Instruction and Culture was founded with its first minister, Soewandi. The new institution sought to create an education that is anti-discriminatory, -elitist, and -capitalist to promote nationalism of the new republic of Indonesia. It was also decided that religion deserved a proper place and attention under the new republic, resulting in an increased support for Pesantren and Islamic Madrasah.

In 1961, 46.7% of the population were literate.

Early education
Pre-school education in Indonesia is covered under PAUD (Pendidikan Anak Usia Dini, lit. Early Age Education) that covers Taman Bermain (playgroup) and Taman Kanak-Kanak (kindergarten, abbreviated TK). PAUD is under direct supervision and coverage of Directorate of Early Age Education Development (Direktorat Pengembangan Pendidikan Anak Usia Dini).

From the age of 2, parents send their children to Taman Bermain. From the age of 4, they attend Taman Kanak-Kanak. Most TKs arrange the classes into two grades: A and B, which are informally called kelas nol kecil (little zero grade) and kelas nol besar (big zero grade) respectively. While this level of education is not compulsory, it is aimed to prepare children for primary schooling. Of the 49,000 kindergartens in Indonesia, 99.35% are privately operated. The kindergarten years are usually divided into "Class A" and "Class B" with students spending a year in each class.

Public primary and secondary education

Indonesians are required to attend 12 years of school. Students must go to school five days a week from 07:30 a.m. until 15.30 p.m.Students can choose between state-run, nonsectarian public schools supervised by the Ministry of National Education (Kemdiknas) or private or semi-private religious (usually Islamic) schools supervised and financed by the Ministry of Religious Affairs. Students can choose to participate in extracurricular activities provided by the school such as sports, arts, or religious studies. However, although 86.1 percent of the Indonesian population is registered as Muslim, according to the 2000 census only 15 percent of school-age individuals attended religious schools. Overall enrollment figures are slightly higher for girls than boys and much higher in Java than the rest of Indonesia.

A central goal of the national education system is to impart secular wisdom about the world and to instruct children in the principles of participation in the modern nation-state, its bureaucracies, and its moral and ideological foundations. Beginning under Guided Democracy (1959–65) and strengthened in the New Order after 1975, a key feature of the national curriculum — was the case for other national institutions — has been instruction in the Pancasila. Children age six and older learned by rote its five principles — belief in one God, humanitarianism, national unity, democracy, and social justice — and were instructed daily to apply the meanings of this key national symbol to their lives. But with the end of the New Order in 1998 and the beginning of the campaign to decentralise the national government, provincial and district-level administrators obtained increasing autonomy in determining the content of schooling, and Pancasila began to play a diminishing role in the curriculum.

A style of pedagogy prevails inside public-school classrooms that emphasises rote learning and deference to the authority of the teacher. Although the youngest children are sometimes allowed to use their local language, by the third year of primary school nearly all instruction is conducted in Indonesian. Teachers customarily do not ask questions of individual students; rather, a standard teaching technique is to narrate a historical event or to describe a mathematical problem, pausing at key junctures to allow the students to call out responses that "fill in the blanks". By not identifying individual problems of students and retaining an emotionally distanced demeanor, teachers are said to show themselves to be patient, which is considered admirable.

Children ages 6–12 attend primary school, called Sekolah Dasar (SD). As of 2014, most elementary schools are government-operated public schools, accounting for 90.29% of all elementary schools in Indonesia. Students spend six years in primary school, though some schools offer an accelerated learning program in which students who perform well can complete the level in five years.

Three years of junior high school (Sekolah Menengah Pertama, or SMP) follows elementary school. Some schools offer an accelerated learning program in which students who perform well can complete the level in two years.

There are academic and vocational junior high schools that lead to senior-level diplomas. There are also "domestic science" junior high schools for girls.

After completion, they may be attend three years of high school (Sekolah Menengah Atas or SMA). Some high schools offer an accelerated learning program so students who perform well can complete their level in two years. Besides high school, students can choose among 47 programmes of vocational and pre-professional high school (Sekolah Menengah Kejuruan or SMK), divided in the following fields: technology and engineering, health, arts, craft and tourism, information and communication technologies, agro-business and agro-technology, business management. Each requires three years of study. At the senior high school level, three-year agricultural, veterinary, and forestry schools are open to students who have graduated from an academic junior high school.

Special schools at the junior and senior levels teach hotel management, legal clerking, plastic arts, and music.

Students with disabilities/special needs may opt to be enrolled in a separate school from the mainstream called Sekolah Luar Biasa (SLB, lit. Extraordinary School).

The Indonesian education system is the fourth largest in the world with more than 50 million students, 3 million teachers, 300,000 schools. Primary to high school level is compulsory. Primary and middle school is free, while in high school, there are small fees. The completion rate for Indonesian primary schools is high. In 2018, the net enrollment rate for primary, middle school, and high school each is 93.5%, 78.84%, and 60.67%. The tertiary-education participation is low at 36.31%. In 2011, the survival rate for primary, middle, and high school as the following numbers: 95.3%, 97.68%, and 96.8%. The higher the percentage of survival rate means that fewer students at certain education level who drop out. Although the Indonesian government has achieved significant improvement in the education sector, there are still many challenges that should be addressed, including funding, management, equity, and education quality.

Teacher-training programs are varied and gradually being upgraded. For example, in the 1950s anyone completing a teacher-training program at the junior high school level could obtain a teacher's certificate. Since the 1970s, however, primary-school teachers have been required to have graduated from a senior high school for teachers, and teachers of higher grades have been required to have completed a university-level education course. Remuneration for primary- and secondary-school teachers, although low, compares favourably with that in other Asian countries such as Malaysia, India, and Thailand. The student–teacher ratio is 17 to 1 and 15.2 to 1, respectively, for primary and secondary schools in 2018; that same year, the overall averages for East Asia & Pacific countries were 17.5 to 1 and 14.8 to 1, respectively.

By 2008, the staff shortage in Indonesia's schools was no longer as acute as in the 1980s, but serious difficulties remain, particularly in the areas of teacher salaries, teacher certification, and finding qualified personnel. In many remote areas of the outer islands, in particular, there is a severe shortage of qualified teachers, and some villages have school buildings but no teachers, books, or supplies. Providing textbooks and other school equipment to Indonesia's 37 million schoolchildren throughout the far-flung archipelago continues to be a significant problem as well, especially in more remote areas.

School grades
The school year is divided into two semesters. The first commences in July and ends in December while the latter commences in January and ends in June.

2013 curriculum

Specialization groups (kelompok peminatan)

Islamic schools

There are three types of Islamic schools in Indonesia, pesantren, madrasah, and sekolah islam. Pesantren can be small with just a few teachers and students to quite large with dozens of teachers and hundreds of students. Pesantren are led by hereditary kiais, who lead the school and have religious authority. Madrasah vary in their ideological foundations and vary in the provision of secular and religious content. Sekolah Islam use the Ministry of Education and Culture's secular curriculum and add their own Islamic curricula.

The secular and nationalist emphasis in public schools has been resisted by some of the Muslim majority. A distinct and vocal minority of these Muslims prefer to place their children in a pesantren (Islamic boarding school) or Islamic school. Usually found in rural areas and directed by a Muslim scholar, pesantren are attended by young people seeking a detailed understanding of the Quran, the Arabic language, sharia, and Muslim traditions and history, as well as more modern subjects such as English, mathematics, and geography. Students can enter and leave the pesantren any time of the year, and the studies are not organized as a progression of courses leading to graduation.

Although the chief aim of pesantren is to produce good Muslims, they do not share a single stance toward Islam or a position on secularism. Some pesantren emphasise the autonomy of modern students to think for themselves and to interpret scripture and modern knowledge in a way that is consistent with the teachings of Islam. Others are more traditional and stress the importance of following the wisdom of elders, including their teachings on science, religion, and family life. Although the terrorist bombings in Kuta, Bali, in 2002 raised suspicions about whether pesantren promote extremist views, the majority of these schools in Indonesia are theologically moderate, reflecting the views of the Indonesian population as a whole. For those who opt for a pesantren education, a sixth-grade equivalency certificate is available after successful completion of a state test.

For students to adapt to life in the modern nation-state, in the 1970s the Muslim-dominated Department of Religion (now the Department of Religious Affairs) advocated the spread of a newer variety of Muslim school: the madrassa. This kind of school integrates religious subjects from the pesantren with secular subjects from the Western-style public-education system. Although in general the public believes that Islamic schools offer lower-quality education, among Islamic schools a madrassa is ranked lower than a pesantren.

Madrasah Ibtidaiyah (MI) is the Islamic schooling alternative to SD, following a curriculum with more focus on Arabic and Islam. Madrasah Tsanawiyah (MTs) is the Islamic schooling equivalent of SMP. Madrasah Aliyah (MA) is the Islamic schooling equivalent of SMA while Madrasah Aliyah Kejuruan (MAK) is the equivalent of SMK.

Higher education

International education
As of January 2015, the International Schools Consultancy (ISC) listed Indonesia as having 190 international schools. ISC defines an 'international school' in the following terms "ISC includes an international school if the school delivers a curriculum to any combination of pre-school, primary or secondary students, wholly or partly in English outside an English-speaking country, or if a school in a country where English is one of the official languages, offers an English-medium curriculum other than the country’s national curriculum and is international in its orientation." This definition is used by publications including The Economist.

See also
Indonesian National Academic Exam
List of schools in Indonesia
List of universities in Indonesia
List of Indonesian agricultural universities and colleges

References

External links
 World Bank data on education in Indonesia
Vocational Education in Indonesia - UNESCO UNEVOC (2013)
 Primary education in the Dutch East Indies
Education in Indonesia, webdossier of the German Education Server